is a 1965 Japanese erotic jidaigeki film directed by Yasuto Hasegawa. The film deals revenge of the forty-seven rōnin.　It is based on Futaro Yamada's novel "Ninpō-chushingura". It is 3rd in Futaro Yamada's Kunoichi film series. The president of Toei company Shigeru Okada asked Sadao Nakajima who directed past 2 Futaro Yamada's Kunoichi films to direct the film but he declined the offer.

Plot
Mumyō Kotarō killed his betrayed fiancé Orie and He flees to Utsunomiya. On his way he happens to saves Chisaka Hyōbu's daughter Oyu(She is exactly like Orie.) be attacked by ninja. Thus he stays Chisaka's residence in Yonezawa. Chisaka was just trying to stop Forty-seven rōnin's revenge against Kira Kōzuke no suke by female ninja's sexual entrapment. Chisaka asks Kotarō to lead female ninja. Kotarō accepts the request on condition of marriage to Oyu.

Cast
 Tetsurō Tamba as Mumyō Kotarō
 Kō Nishimura as Chisaka Hyōbu
 Hiroko Sakuramachi as Oyu/Orie
 Tsuyako Okajima
 Akiji Kobayashi as Horibe Yasubei
 Seizo Fukumoto as Namiuchi Dainoshin
 Yuriko Mishima as Oyumi
 Kazuko Oura as Toyo
 Daisuke Awaji as Mononose Tsukinori  
 Yoshihiro Igarashi as Uesugi Tsununori
 Daizen Shishido as Shiraito
 Kunie Tanaka as Fuwa Kazuemon
 Minoru Ōki as Ōishi Kuranosuke

See also
Kunoichi ninpō 1st in Futaro Yamada's Kunoichi film series. Directed by Sadao Nakajima.
Kunoichi Keshō 2nd in Futaro Yamada's Kunoichi film series. Directed by Sadao Nakajima.

References

External links

1965 films
1960s Japanese-language films
Ninja films
Samurai films
1960s Japanese films